Renate Riek (born 11 March 1960) is a German volleyball player. She competed in the women's tournament at the 1984 Summer Olympics.

References

1960 births
Living people
German women's volleyball players
Olympic volleyball players of West Germany
Volleyball players at the 1984 Summer Olympics
Sportspeople from Stuttgart